Murdo John MacKay (b. August 8, 1916 in Fort William, Ontario – d. August 8, 2000 in Fort William, Ontario) was a Canadian retired professional ice hockey forward. MacKay played 14 regular season games and 15 playoff games in the National Hockey League for the Montreal Canadiens during a long career in the professional minor leagues.

External links

1916 births
2000 deaths
Buffalo Bisons (AHL) players
Canadian expatriate ice hockey players in the United States
Canadian ice hockey forwards
Cleveland Barons (1937–1973) players
Ice hockey people from Ontario
Montreal Canadiens players
New York Rovers players
Philadelphia Ramblers players
Sportspeople from Thunder Bay